Naheed Qasimi (Urdu: ڈاكٹر ناہید قا سمی ) is a Pakistani writer and literary critic. She serves as Head of the Department of Urdu, Samnabad College, Lahore. She is author of several books of literary criticism, and has edited collections of poetry by her father Ahmad Nadeem Qasimi.

References

Pakistani dramatists and playwrights
Pakistani literary critics
Urdu-language poets from Pakistan
Pakistani television writers
Year of birth missing (living people)
Living people
Writers from Lahore
Punjabi people